Iotalamic acid, sold under the brand name Conray, is an iodine-containing radiocontrast agent. It is available in form of its salts, sodium iotalamate and meglumine iotalamate. It can be given intravenously or intravesically (into the urinary bladder).

A radioactive formulation is also available as sodium iothalamate I-125 injection (brand name Glofil-125). It is indicated for evaluation of glomerular filtration in the diagnosis or monitoring of people with kidney disease.

References

External links 
 
 

Benzoic acids
Radiocontrast agents
Acetanilides
Benzamides
Iodoarenes